The Henderson Community Building, also known as the Old Sibley County Courthouse, is a historic government building in Henderson, Minnesota, United States.  It was built in 1879 and served as the home of Sibley County's government until 1915, when the county seat was relocated to Gaylord, Minnesota.  

Since 1915 the building has served as Henderson's city hall.  As of 2022 it also houses a senior center and the Joseph R. Brown Minnesota River Center.  The later is a history museum containing exhibits on the Minnesota River and Joseph R. Brown (1805–1870), founder of Henderson and a prominent figure in early Minnesota history.  

The building was listed on the National Register of Historic Places as Sibley County Courthouse-1879 in 1979 for its local significance in the theme of architecture.  It was nominated for being Sibley County's first purpose-built courthouse and for representing one of the era's favorite styles of architecture for public buildings: the Italianate.

See also
 List of county courthouses in Minnesota
 National Register of Historic Places listings in Sibley County, Minnesota

References

External links
 Joseph R. Brown Minnesota River Center

1879 establishments in Minnesota
Buildings and structures in Sibley County, Minnesota
City and town halls in Minnesota
County courthouses in Minnesota
Courthouses on the National Register of Historic Places in Minnesota
Italianate architecture in Minnesota
National Register of Historic Places in Sibley County, Minnesota